The quarter guard is a small detachment of troops that can be used as a ceremonial guard which may be mounted at the entrance of a military unit to pay compliments as required. A quarter guard is to consist of one non-commissioned officer and six or eight other ranks formed up in two ranks. It is technically a minuscule guard of honour.

Indian Army
In the Indian Army, the quarter guard is the main point of security arrangements for the army camp/garrison Regimental depot. The regimental colours, the armoury and the treasury would be kept in this building. In addition to this, the quarter guard also has a lock-up often in the guardhouse to hold soldiers charged with minor crimes (absent without leave, drunkenness being among the usual crimes).

The standard guard strength is 6 guards, 1 guard 2/ic (2nd in command - usually a Naik or Lance Naik) and a guard commander (usually a Havildar). Additionally, in some units, a bugler would also be present for calling the various duty calls etc. At the time of emergencies/threats, the strength of the guard would be increased.

The Armoury is a part of the Quarter Guard. A Quarter Guard is a place of pride for the Army Unit and the guards detailed on duty there are always in ceremonials. A visiting dignitary invariably visits the Quarter Guard. A Quarter Guard is expected to reflect the high standards of the unit. It has some relation with the number of troops in presidential guard. May be a quarter of governor general guard in British Empire.

References

Military traditions
Ceremonial units and formations